The Chinese Pastoral Bible ( or ; pinyin: mùlíng shèngjīng; jyutping: muk6 ling4 sing3 ging1) is the Chinese edition of the Christian Community Bible. Work on the translation began in 1991, took 5 years to finish, and the completed translation was published in 1999. This translation is available in both traditional and simplified Chinese.

See also
 Chinese Bible Translations
Christian Community Bible
Chinese Union Version
Studium Biblicum Version

Further reading
Kung Kao Po, issues 2871, 2881, and 2923 (in Chinese)
Zenit News Agency news releases, September 7, 1999  and February 2, 2000

External links
Browsable HTML version of the Pastoral Bible
Other browsable HTML version of the Pastoral Bible

1999 books
Bible translations into Chinese
1999 in Christianity